Pegah Anvarian, also known as Pegah Anvarian Watson, is an Iranian-born American fashion designer, fashion stylist, creative director, and interior designer. She had her own fashion design label from 2005 until spring 2008. Her design work has shown at Los Angeles Fashion Week and New York Fashion Week. Anvarian worked as the creative director for Three Dots fashion label, starting 2009. Starting in 2014, she is the creative director of Poetry & Prose fashion label.

Biography
Pegah Anvarian was born in Iran, and was raised in Dallas, Texas. Her father was a photographer and her mother was an educator. Her mother taught her to sew at age six, and two years later she was designing clothing at the age of eight. She never attended any formal design school.

Career 
Anvarian began a year tour with the American rock band The B-52's as their stylist. She also designed the costumes for one of The B-52s music video. This early career allowed Anvarian to relocate to New York City in 1996.   

She had no previous design experience, but it was her entrepreneurial mindset that allowed her to create her own pieces and designs. Anvarian is known for her draped jersey tops and dresses, as well as a cashmere jersey knit dress that became her signature piece. In Fall 2003, she presented her line at Los Angeles Fashion Week for her first collection that debuted. In Fall 2004, her work featured many low cuts and off-the-shoulder tops, and halter tunics. In 2007, she debuted at New York Fashion Week and her work included leather and textured-wool bubble jackets and bolero jackets, and it was noted she had some fit issues with her bottoms. Her 2007, work was astrology-themed in dark colors, this included star prints, tissue-thin washed wool tops, jersey dresses with low tops, draped coats, and biker jackets with fitted sleeves. In spring 2008, her own fashion label closed.

Santino Rice worked under Anvarian, prior to his involvement with the television series Project Runway in 2005.  

Her fashion has been seen on celebrities such as Rachel Zoe, Tracee Ellis Ross, Cameron Diaz, LeAnn Rimes, and Naomi Watts. She has been spotted in many publications such as Lucky, The New York Times, The Los Angeles Times, W magazine, Washington Post, and Harper's Bazaar.

See also 

 List of Iranian artists

References

External links
Official site
Couture Candy

American fashion designers
American women fashion designers
American people of Iranian descent
Iranian fashion designers
Iranian women fashion designers
Year of birth missing (living people)
Living people
21st-century American women